RVIVR is an American punk rock band from Olympia, Washington. The band tours frequently and their shows are characterised by energetic performances as well as defense of gender equality. They have released their studio albums and EPs as free downloads on Rumbletowne Records' website.

History
After the dissolution of New York band Latterman in 2007, Mattie Jo Canino moved to Olympia, Washington and with Erica Freas (vocals, guitar), Kevin Rainsberry (drums), and Nell Tallos (bass) formed RVIVR.

Canino had felt that Latterman's political lyrics were being ignored by largely male audiences only interested in moshing. For RVIVR; Canino and Freas, in both songwriting and interviews, vocally ensure the message of gender and sociopolitical equality is at the heart of what the band does.

They released 7-inch EP Life Moves at the end of 2008 on Freas's Rumbletowne Records, along with Derailer the next year. Their eponymous debut album was recorded with Canino's former Latterman bandmate Phil Douglas. It was released in April 2010 with the band touring the U.S. and Europe tour in support. German label Yo-Yo Records released 7-inch Dirty Water the same year.

In 2011 Tallos left the band and was replaced by Al Paoli. The tracks from their first three EPs were compiled as Joester Sessions '08-'11, named after Joey Seward with whom they had recorded everything. After which they released another 7-inch on Yo-Yo, Belebend.

Their second album The Beauty Between, also recorded with Joey Seward, came out in 2012 on Rumbletowne in the U.S. and Yo-Yo in Europe. 

For the next couple of years the band toured the U.S., Europe, and Australia with various bassists, including Caves' Lou Hanman. In 2014 the band released the 12-inch EP Bicker and Breathe, again on Rumbletowne and Yo-Yo.

In 2017 the band self released 7-inch "The Tide", and Don Giovanni Records reissued the band's first two albums and the compilation.

Members
Current
 Erica Freas – vocals, guitar (2008–present)
 Mattie Jo Canino – vocals, guitar (2008–present)
 Kevin Rainsberry – drums (2008–present)

Current touring musicians
 Lou Hanman – bass (2014, 2016–present)

Former
 Nell Tallos (2008–2011)
 Al Paoli – bass (2011–2012)
 Bex Berryhill – bass (2013–2014)

Former touring musicians
 Tammy Martin – bass (2011)
 Cameron Thaut – bass (2011, 2014)
 David Combs – bass (2014-2015)
 Sue Werner #10 – bass (2015)

Former studio musicians
 Chris Bauermeister - bass (Bicker and Breather EP, 2014) 
  Joey Seward - bass (2010, 2013–2014)

Discography

Studio albums
 RVIVR (2010)
 The Beauty Between (2013)

EPs/singles
 Life Moves 7-inch (2008)
 Derailer 7-inch (2009)
 Dirty Water EP (2010)
 Belebend 7-inch (2011)
 Bicker and Breathe EP (2014)
 The Tide (b Shaggy) 7-inch (2017)

Compilations
 The Joester Sessions Collection (2011)

References

External links
 Official website
 Rumbletowne Records
 Yo-Yo Records

Punk rock groups from Washington (state)
Musical groups from Olympia, Washington
Don Giovanni Records artists